This is a list of past and present publications at the College of William & Mary. Many of them, such as The Flat Hat, are funded through the College's student activities fees. Some, however, such as The Virginia Informer, are privately funded.

The oldest extant student news sheet from the College of William & Mary is The Owl, an unofficial publication with a strong Southern political slant from 1854. The only known copy is held by the Special Collections Research Center (SCRC) in Earl Gregg Swem Library. Student publications in a variety of formats are actively collected by the SCRC.

Overseeing all school-funded publications is the Publications Council.

Newspapers and informational magazines

Literary and art

Humor and satire

Special interest

Discipline-specific

Miscellaneous

References

College of William & Mary student life
College of William and Mary